Fencing at the 26th Southeast Asian Games was held in University of Indonesia, Jakarta, Indonesia.

Medalists

Men

Women

Medal table

External links
  2011 Southeast Asian Games

2011
2011 Southeast Asian Games events
Southeast Asian Games
Fencing competitions in Indonesia